Gerald W. Johnson may refer to:

 Gerald W. Johnson (journalist) (1890–1980), America journalist, editor, essayist, historian, biographer, and novelist
 Gerald W. Johnson (nuclear expert) (1917–2005), American nuclear expert and negotiator
 Gerald W. Johnson (military officer) (1919-2002), American fighter ace and Lieutenant General